The Samsung Galaxy A31 is a mid-range Android smartphone developed by Samsung Electronics as part of their 2020 A-series smartphone lineup. It was announced on March 24, 2020, and first released on April 27, 2020, as the successor to the Galaxy A30 and A30s. The phone comes preinstalled with Android 10 and Samsung's custom One UI 2.1 software overlay.The display User Interface from Samsung Galaxy A31 is Infinity-U.

Specifications

Hardware 
The Samsung Galaxy A31 is a plastic build with a glass front.

The phone's 6.4-inch, FHD Super AMOLED panel has a screen-to-body ratio of 84.9% and an aspect ratio of 20:9 to match that of other Samsung phones sold in 2020. An optical, under-display fingerprint reader replaces the rear-mounted one seen on the previous A30 models.

The new L-shaped rear camera system (similar to the ones seen on newer Samsung phones) utilizes four cameras, a 48 MP main sensor with an f/2.0 aperture, an 8 MP ultra-wide lens with a 123° field of view and a 5 MP macro and depth camera, both with an f/2.4 aperture. A U-shaped screen cut-out houses a single 20 MP selfie camera lens. Both front and back camera systems are capable of recording at a maximum of 1080p-at-30fps videos.

A large 5000 mAh battery with fast charging at 15 watts is also supported.

Customers, depending on the region, can choose from a range of new colour selections, such like Prism Crush Black, Prism Crush Blue, Prism Crush Red and Prism Crush White.

Software 
The phone comes with Android 10 and Samsung's custom One UI 2.1 software overlay. Depending on the region, it can support contactless NFC payments through Samsung Pay and other various payment apps that can be installed separately.

Software experience is comparable to that of other 2020 Samsung devices, and it boasts many of the software perks costlier Samsung devices boast, such as Edge Screen and Edge Lighting.

As with most other Samsung phones released during 2020, the Microsoft-Samsung partnership Link to Windows option which comes as standard, can be accessed in the Android notification panel.

Banking on Samsung's latest software update schedule, the phone should be eligible for two major Android upgrades.

 The A31 has got the Android 11 update with One UI 3.1 at May, but it may vary at other regions around the world.

In August 2021, Samsung gradually rolled out a major security update to the A31.

Reception 
The Samsung Galaxy A31 received mixed reviews with most reviewers acclaiming the brilliant screen, excellent battery life, software and overall build quality. They critiqued the performance relative to the phone's main competition, the phone's poor camera quality, and the lack of a night mode and various other camera features. Reviewers were also reluctant to recommend the device considering that even in Samsung's own mid-range A-series one could get a better overall package by spending just a little more money.

References

External links
 Official website

Android (operating system) devices
Samsung smartphones
Samsung Galaxy
Mobile phones introduced in 2020
Mobile phones with multiple rear cameras